Abbot's Hill School is an independent day school for girls aged 4–16 years and a day nursery and pre-school for girls and boys from 6 months in Hemel Hempstead, Hertfordshire in the United Kingdom.

History 
The School celebrated its 100th Anniversary in 2012, having been founded on the present site by Alice, Katrine and Mary Baird who also ran a school in the Malverns. The School's central building was built in 1836 by the paper manufacturer, John Dickinson, as a home for him and his family and he named it Abbot's Hill. The Dickinson family founded one of the world's largest stationery firms of the 19th and 20th centuries and John Dickinson's grandson sold Abbot's Hill to the Baird sisters.

Over the years the School has developed and grown in a variety of ways, but the key milestones in its history were in 1969, when St Nicholas House School moved to the Abbot's Hill site to form the Junior Department, and in 2003, when boarding ceased. However, the School retains "its boarding feel", which is to be seen in the extended school day, the emphasis given to extra-curricular pursuits, the intrinsic importance of pastoral care and the School's strong sense of community.

Abbot's Hill House
It had been the home of the inventor and entrepreneur John Dickinson (1782–1869) who was his own architect in its building, just east of his paper mill, Nash Mill.  Construction commenced in 1836. The building material was unusual, being dark grey stone setts, taken from the railway lines when replaced by wooden sleepers. The house design was unusual, having only a single door to the outside despite its size. John Dickinson's youngest daughter Harriet Ann (1823–1858) married Sir John Evans, KCB (1823–1908), and their son Sir Arthur John Evans (1851–1941) inherited Abbot's Hill but never lived there.

Structure 

The School is very much an all-through school, although for the purposes of educational and pastoral management it is divided into two parts, the Senior School and the Prep School, which are located on the same site. The Head of Senior School and Head of Prep School have responsibility for the day-to-day running of the Senior and Prep Schools and they are supported by their own separate management teams.

The Senior School educates about 260 girls from Years 7 to 11. The normal size of a year group is around 50 girls. About two-thirds of the girls joining Year 7 come from the Prep School, although the proportion fluctuates from year to year. The Prep School educates about 190 pupils from Nursery to Year 6. There are some boys on the roll in the Nursery and in Reception.

In addition to their forms and year groups, the Prep and Senior girls belong to one of three pupil-led Clans - Cameron, Macneil and MacDonald, which act as the equivalent of houses - which provide the opportunity for competitions of many kinds. The fact that the School educates girls only up to the age of 16 offers pupils an opportunity to take responsibility at an earlier age than in many schools, allowing them to develop proficiency in management, organisation and leadership. The most public example of this was the success of Abbot's Hill pupil Zara Brownless, winner of 2011's BBC Young Apprentice.

Sports, the arts and extra-curricular activities 

The School's programme of creative, sporting, cultural and recreational opportunities is impressive. Girls of all ages are involved in dramatic and musical productions throughout the year, which make use of the excellent facilities on offer. There are a great many opportunities for ensemble performance, particularly choral.

There is also a wide variety of clubs and extra-curricular activities including skiing, strategic thinking, debating, chamber choir, music, drama, STEM club, languages, art and sports. The younger girls' activities include golf, calligraphy, science, art, sports, board games and dance. These in-house activities are complemented by a rich array of trips and visits for senior and prep pupils.

Notable former pupils

 Jane Scott, Duchess of Buccleuch, model
 Katharine Elliot, Baroness Elliot of Harwood, public servant and politician
 Marilyn Okoro, British 800m and 4 × 400 m Athlete
 Montana Brown, Love Island Star

References

External links 
 School website

Private schools in Hertfordshire
Girls' schools in Hertfordshire
Dacorum
Member schools of the Girls' Schools Association
Educational institutions established in 1912
1912 establishments in England